Stephen Thomas Redvers Coate is a British-American economist and currently Kiplinger Professor of Public Policy at Cornell University. His research focuses on developing economic models to analyze public policy issues.

Education 
Coate graduated with a B.Sc. in economics from the University College of Swansea in 1980. He went on to further study at the University of Sussex and received an M.A. in public policy in 1981. He received his PhD from Northwestern University in 1988.

Career 
Coate's first academic position was as an assistant professor of public policy at the Harvard Kennedy School of Government. He left Harvard for the University of Pennsylvania in 1990, where he worked as an assistant professor of economics until 1993 and assistant professor of public policy until 1997. He was granted tenure and associate professorship in 1997 but left for his current position at Cornell University the following year.

He was elected fellow of the Econometric Society and the American Academy of Arts and Sciences in 2004 and 2017, respectively.

He has served a range of academic journals in an editorial capacity, such as the Journal of Public Economics, the American Economic Review and the Quarterly Journal of Economics.

Selected works

References

External links 
Profile on the website of Cornell University

Alumni of Swansea University
Alumni of the University of Sussex
Northwestern University alumni
Harvard Kennedy School faculty
University of Pennsylvania faculty
Cornell University faculty
Fellows of the Econometric Society
Fellows of the American Academy of Arts and Sciences
American economists
British economists
Political economists
Public economists
Living people
Year of birth missing (living people)